The Umpawaug District School is a one-room schoolhouse located near the junction of Umpawaug Road and Marchant in Redding, Connecticut, United States. The school was built in 1790 and was added to the National Register of Historic Places on December 1, 1988. It is the only surviving district schoolhouse in the town. The building was used as a schoolhouse until 1931. Once a year the Redding Historical Society will open the schoolhouse to the public. It is still owned by the town, but is managed by the Redding Historical Society as a museum.

See also
National Register of Historic Places listings in Fairfield County, Connecticut

References

Defunct schools in Connecticut
Federal architecture in Connecticut
School buildings completed in 1790
Former school buildings in the United States
National Register of Historic Places in Fairfield County, Connecticut
School buildings on the National Register of Historic Places in Connecticut
One-room schoolhouses in Connecticut
Redding, Connecticut
Museums in Fairfield County, Connecticut
Buildings and structures in Redding, Connecticut